Earl Sidney Weaver (August 14, 1930 – January 19, 2013) was an American professional baseball manager, author, and television broadcaster. After playing in minor league baseball, he retired without playing in Major League Baseball (MLB). He became a minor league manager, and then managed in MLB for 17 years with the Baltimore Orioles (1968–1982; 1985–86). Weaver's style of managing was summed up in the quote: "pitching, defense, and the three-run homer." He did not believe in placing emphasis on "small ball" tactics such as stolen bases, hit and run plays, or sacrifice bunts. He was inducted into the Baseball Hall of Fame in 1996.

Playing career
He was the son of Earl Milton Weaver, a dry cleaner who cleaned the uniforms of the St. Louis Cardinals and Browns, and Ethel Genevieve Wakefield. Baseball Hall of Fame pitcher Jim Palmer, who pitched under Weaver for 14 seasons in the major leagues, wrote that his manager was "brought up in St. Louis on the bad side of a street where even the good side isn't too good."

After playing for Beaumont High School in his hometown, St. Louis, Missouri, the St. Louis Cardinals signed the 17-year-old Weaver in 1948 as a second baseman. A slick fielder but never much of a hitter, he worked his way up to the Texas League Houston Buffaloes (two steps below the majors) in 1951, though never made it to the big league club. Weaver was later traded to the Pittsburgh Pirates organization, then moved on to the Orioles, where he began his managing career.

Palmer once noted: "The only thing that Earl knows about a curve ball is he couldn't hit it."

Managerial career
Weaver started his minor league managerial career in 1956 with the unaffiliated Knoxville Smokies in the South Atlantic League. He joined the Orioles in 1957 as manager of their Fitzgerald, Georgia, club in the Georgia–Florida League. The Orioles moved him up to their franchise in Dublin, Georgia, in 1958, and to their Aberdeen, South Dakota, club in 1959. In 1960, he managed the Fox Cities Foxes in Wisconsin in the Class-B Three-I League. He advanced to the AA Elmira Pioneers in 1962 and to the AAA Rochester Red Wings in 1966.

As a minor league manager, he compiled a record of 841 wins and 697 defeats (.547) with three championships in 11½ seasons. Weaver was appointed to replace Gene Woodling as the Orioles' first-base coach on October 3, 1967, and spent the first half of the 1968 season in that capacity before succeeding Hank Bauer as manager on July 11. His contract was for one year; he would continue to work under one-year contracts throughout his tenure with the team.

During his tenure as major league manager, the Orioles won the American League pennant in 1969, 1970, 1971 and 1979, each time winning 100 games. Weaver was the first manager since Billy Southworth 
(1942–44) to win 100 games in three straight seasons.

In 1969, the Orioles were defeated in the World Series in five games by the New York Mets team known as the Miracle Mets. He was ejected in Game 4 of that series by umpire Shag Crawford for arguing balls and strikes. In 1970, the Orioles won the World Series by defeating the Cincinnati Reds (The "Big Red Machine") in five games. In 1971, the Orioles lost the World Series in seven games to the Pittsburgh Pirates. Pirates pitcher Steve Blass pitched a complete game and gave up four hits in the deciding seventh game, allowing the Orioles to score only one run.

Weaver loved scoring with three-run home runs, "a great plan if you have Boog Powells and Frank Robinsons and Brooks Robinsons," according to Palmer. The 1974 Orioles were not hitting as many home runs, yet Weaver insisted on continuing to use the strategy. With the team eight games behind the Red Sox in late August, the Orioles held a secret player's-only meeting at Paul Blair's house. Their new strategy, according to Palmer, was "Squeeze every hit and every base and every run you can out of every play." To accomplish this goal, the players came up with secret signs they would use in games. The new strategy worked, as Baltimore overcame the deficit to clinch the division at the end of the year. According to Brooks Robinson, "It took Earl about three or four games to finally figure out what the heck we were doing in that situation, and I think he ended up saying, 'Well, you'd better be right.'...It worked out well. And Earl loved us all, anyway."

Weaver's 1,000th MLB career victory as manager was a 5–3 Opening Day result over the Chicago White Sox at Memorial Stadium on April 6, 1979. That year, the Orioles, which saw Weaver use 140 different lineups during the regular season, would reach the World Series again, this time losing in seven games to the Pittsburgh Pirates. He expressed plans to retire following the 1982 season prior to Game 6 of that World Series on October 16. He had originally targeted the expiration of his contract upon the conclusion of the 1980 campaign to step away from the sport.

In 1982, Weaver announced he would retire at the end of the season. After Palmer posted a 6.84 ERA in five starts, GM Hank Peters announced that "Palmer is never, ever, ever going to start another game in an Orioles uniform. I've had it." Weaver moved Palmer to the bullpen, but with the team needing another starter, he put Palmer back in the rotation in June. Shortly thereafter, Palmer went on an 11-game winning streak. The Orioles played poorly for the first half of the year before climbing in the standings to just three games behind going into a season-ending four-game series against the division-leading Brewers at Memorial Stadium. The Orioles beat them handily in the first three games to pull into a first-place tie. The final game of the series, and the season, on October 3, would decide the AL East title. Televised nationally on ABC, the Orioles suffered a crushing 10–2 loss. After the game, the crowd called for Weaver to come out. This tribute to the retiring Weaver provided intense emotion against the backdrop of the season-ending defeat, as Weaver, in tears, stood on the field and applauded back to the fans, and shared words and an embrace with Brewers manager Harvey Kuenn. On TV, broadcaster Howard Cosell captured the moment: "Thee Er-uhl of Bal-tee-more. They love...troo-lee love...this man, Er-uhl Weeev-ver! A man of the people. The Weeeve! One of a kind. A baseball gar-rate!" Joe Altobelli was appointed his successor one month later on November 12, 1982.

The year following Weaver's retirement, Baltimore won the World Series. Palmer wrote, "We won with a team Earl put together." Owner Edward Bennett Williams coaxed Weaver out of retirement midway through the 1985 season, but he retired for good after the 1986 season, the only full losing season of his major league career. Weaver's managerial record is 1,480–1,060 (.583), including 100+ win seasons in 1969 (109), 1970 (108), 1971 (101), 1979 (102), and 1980 (100). Weaver had a record average 94.3 wins per season.

In 1989, Weaver managed the Gold Coast Suns in the new Senior Professional Baseball Association. Less than a week into the season, Weaver was ejected from his first game. He later commented, "These umpires are high school rejects. The league went for the cheapest umpiring association. There should be no league if this continues." The Suns failed to make the playoffs in the 1989–90 season and folded after one season.

Disciplinary actions
Weaver never got along well with umpires. Palmer described their relationship: "Earl Weaver hated umpires with every fiber of his win-or-die being. He yelled at them. He screamed in their faces. He kicked dirt on them. He tore up rule books. He taunted and tortured them." Weaver was ejected from games at least 91 times during the regular season (98, according to one source) and several more times during post-season play. He was ejected from both games in a doubleheader three times. He was twice ejected from games before they even started, both times by Ron Luciano. Luciano alone ejected him from all four games of a minor-league series and eight games in the majors. Sometimes, even after Weaver had been thrown out of a game, he would phone the Oriole dugout to tell the coaches what moves to make.

He also received four multiple-game suspensions. He was well known for the humor that often accompanied his ejections. During one particular tirade with an umpire, Weaver headed to the dugout screaming, "I'm going to check the rule-book on that" to which the umpire replied, "Here, use mine." Weaver shot back, "That's no good—I can't read Braille." He once told an umpire that he could appear on What's My Line? wearing his mask, chest protector, holding his ball/strike indicator and still nobody would guess he was an umpire.

Weaver had a penchant for kicking dirt on umpires, and for turning his cap backwards whenever he sparred with umpires in order to get as close to them as possible without actually touching them. His rivalry with Luciano was legendary, to the point where the AL rearranged umpiring schedules for an entire year so that Luciano would not work Orioles games. A year later on August 26, 1979, in the third inning of the opener of an Orioles-White Sox doubleheader at Comiskey Park, he ejected Weaver who then publicly questioned Luciano's "integrity" and received a three-game suspension. Weaver once derisively called Luciano "one of the few umpires that people have paid their way into the park to see."

Marty Springstead was one of Weaver's least favorite umpires. On September 15, 1977, in Toronto, Weaver asked Springstead to have a tarpaulin covering the Toronto Blue Jays bullpen area removed; the tarp was weighted down by bricks and Earl argued his left fielder could be injured if he ran into the bricks while chasing a foul ball. When the umpire refused to order the Blue Jays to move the tarp, Weaver pulled the Orioles off the field. The umpire declared a forfeit, the only forfeit in Orioles history. On another infamous occasion, in Cleveland, Weaver stormed to the dugout and returned to the field with a rulebook in his pocket. "Don't take that book out or you're outta here," Springstead warned. Weaver pulled it out anyway and was ejected. After that game, Weaver said of Springstead, "He's a terrific guy...He's just not a very good umpire."

One of Weaver's most infamous tirades came on September 17, 1980, in a game against the Detroit Tigers. First base umpire Bill Haller, who was wearing a microphone for a documentary on the daily life of an MLB umpire, called a balk on Oriole pitcher Mike Flanagan. Weaver charged out of the dugout and began screaming at Haller, who was already angry at Weaver for publicly questioning his integrity by suggesting he be prohibited from working Tigers games in 1972 because his brother was the Tigers' backup catcher at the time. After Weaver was ejected, he launched into a profanity-filled argument in which he accused Haller of blatantly calling the game out of the Orioles' favor. He also accused Haller of poking him in the chest, and after Haller denied doing so they called each other liars. Weaver's contempt for umpires was often mutual. One night in 1973 Weaver threw his cap to the ground and began a vehement argument with Luciano. Luciano's crew-mate Don Denkinger walked over to Weaver's cap, stepped on it with the sharp cleats of both shoes, and slowly twisted back and forth.

Philosophy

Weaver's oft-quoted managerial philosophy was "pitching, defense, and the three-run homer." Weaver expanded on his philosophy in three books he authored: Winning! (1972); It's What You Learn After You Know It All That Counts (1983); and Weaver on Strategy (1984), which was republished as Weaver on Strategy: The Classic Work on the Art of Managing a Baseball Team (2002, with co-author Terry Pluto).  Weaver eschewed the use of so-called "inside baseball" or "small ball" tactics such as the stolen base, the hit and run, or the sacrifice bunt, preferring a patient approach ("waiting for the home run"), saying "If you play for one run, that's all you'll get" and "On offense, your most precious possessions are your 27 outs". Weaver claims to have never had a sign for the hit and run, citing the play makes both the baserunner and the hitter vulnerable, as the baserunner is susceptible to being caught stealing and the hitter is required to swing at any pitch thrown no matter how far outside the strike zone it may be or how unhittable the pitch is.

Weaver strongly believed in finishing as high in the standings as possible, even if a championship was not involved: In 1977, the Orioles entered the final weekend of the season tied for second place in the AL East with the Red Sox, three games behind the division-leading Yankees, to play a scheduled three-game series against the Red Sox in Boston, while the Yankees played three at home against Detroit. The Red Sox won the first game of the series, 11–10, on September 30, eliminating the Orioles from division title contention; however, after the game Weaver insisted, in an interview with a reporter, that "we're still trying to finish second." The following day, the Orioles won, 8–7, eliminating the Red Sox (the Yankees having lost on both days) and leaving the teams tied for second place headed into the series' and the season's final game, which was rained out, resulting in the Red Sox and Orioles finishing in a tie for second place. Weaver also insisted his players maintained a professional appearance at all times. He allowed mustaches, but not beards, and, as a rule, players had to wear a suit or jacket and tie on board an airplane for a road trip. Weaver "was fiercely loyal to his players," said Palmer, who recalled that in 1976 the manager took his side when he was negotiating for a raise with the Orioles' owners. "He just never got to know them," Palmer remembered, observing that the first time Weaver ran into Dennis Martínez after retiring, all he had to say to Martínez was, "How's your curveball?" After he became the Orioles' manager, he hated being referred to as "Coach," complaining even when players mistakenly referred to him as that out of respect.

Use of statistics
Weaver made extensive use of statistics to create matchups which were more favorable either for his batter or his pitcher. He had various notebooks with all sorts of splits and head-to-head numbers for his batters and against his pitchers and would assemble his lineups according to the matchups he had. For example, despite the fact Gold Glove Award shortstop Mark Belanger was a weak hitter, in 19 plate appearances he hit .625 with a .684 on-base percentage and .625 slugging percentage against Jim Kern and would be slotted high in the lineup when facing him. Similarly, Boog Powell, the 1970 American League MVP, hit a meager .178/.211/.278 against Mickey Lolich over 96 plate appearances and would be substituted, possibly with a hitter like Chico Salmon, who hit a much more acceptable .300/.349/.400 against the same pitcher. Palmer said, "Earl scribbled stats, piles and piles of figures and percentages on everybody and everything. All those sheets with all those numbers made him a better manager."

In 1984, Weaver was credited by sportscaster Craig Sager, then of CNN, with being the first major league manager to have used computerized statistical records as part of his decision-making process.

Use of the bench
In the Orioles teams of the late 1970s and early 1980s, Weaver made frequent use of platoons, with the most obvious example being the use of Gary Roenicke and John Lowenstein in left field, without affordable full-time solutions. Weaver also exploited a loophole in the designated hitter rule by listing as the DH one of his starting pitchers who would not be appearing in that day's game, who would then be substituted before their first at-bat. This gave him another opportunity to exploit pitcher-batter matchups, in the case the opposing starting pitcher left the game early because of injury or ineffectiveness before it was the DH's turn in the batting order. A rule was created to stop the use of this tactic, allegedly (by Weaver) because it was distorting pinch-hitting statistics.

Weaver used radar guns to track the speed of pitched balls during the 1975 spring training season.

Lack of knowledge about pitching
Palmer said, "I learned a lot from Earl Weaver. The first thing I learned was that he didn't know a thing about pitching." Dave McNally agreed: "The only thing Earl Weaver knows about pitching is that he can't hit it." Weaver was a fan of sliders for some reason. Mike Flanagan figured out that Weaver got less angry when pitchers gave up hits on sliders than when they gave up hits on other pitches. "Every hit after that, I told him it was off a slider," Flanagan said. While Palmer was pitching for Rochester for 1967, with the bases loaded against the Buffalo Bisons and Johnny Bench coming up to bat, Weaver came out to the mound and told Palmer, "Throw him a fastball down the middle." Palmer complied, and Bench hit a grand slam. Palmer did, however, credit Weaver's ability to recognize good pitchers. "He could spot them, trade for them, stick with them. He might have driven them crazy, but he knew which ones to drive crazy." "I always said I gave Mike Cuellar more chances than I gave my first wife," Weaver maintained.

Managerial record

Broadcasting career

ABC
Between his stints as manager, Weaver served as a color commentator for ABC television, calling the 1983 World Series (which the Orioles won) along with Al Michaels and Howard Cosell. Weaver was the lead ABC color commentator in 1983 (replacing Don Drysdale, who moved over to secondary play-by-play for ABC) but was also employed by the Baltimore Orioles as a consultant. At the time, ABC had a policy preventing an announcer who was employed by a team from working games involving that team. So, whenever the Orioles were on the primary ABC game, Weaver worked the backup game. This policy forced Weaver to resign from the Orioles consulting position in October so that he can work the World Series for ABC. Weaver later called the 1984 National League Championship Series (between the San Diego Padres and Chicago Cubs) for ABC alongside fellow hall of famers Reggie Jackson, who played for Weaver in 1976, and Don Drysdale.

Manager's Corner
While managing the Orioles, Weaver hosted a radio show called Manager's Corner with Baltimore Oriole play by play announcer Tom Marr in which he would give his views on baseball and answer questions from fans. Weaver and Marr once recorded a prank version of the program, giving hilarious off-color answers to queries ranging from Terry Crowley, "team speed" and even growing tomatoes (one of Weaver's hobbies was gardening). The tape, which was not broadcast at the time, has since become legendary in Baltimore sports circles and has even been aired (in heavily edited fashion) on local sports radio.

In media
Weaver wrote three books: Winning! (1972), Weaver on Strategy (1984), and It's What You Learn After You Know It All That Counts (1983).

In 1987, Weaver assisted in the development of the AI for the computer game Earl Weaver Baseball, which was published by Electronic Arts. The game was one of the precursors of the EA Sports line.

Death
Weaver died about 2 a.m. on January 19, 2013, of an apparent heart attack while on an Orioles' fantasy cruise aboard the Celebrity Silhouette in the Caribbean Sea. According to the Silhouettes itinerary, the ship had left Labadee, Haiti, on January 18 and was expected to dock at Fort Lauderdale, Florida on January 20, 2013. Weaver's wife of 49 years, Marianna, was at his side when he died. He was 82 years old. By coincidence, another Baseball Hall of Fame member, the St. Louis Cardinals' Stan Musial, died later that day.

Upon Weaver's death, Bud Selig, then-commissioner of Major League Baseball, released the following statement: "Earl Weaver was a brilliant baseball man, a true tactician in the dugout and one of the key figures in the rich history of the Baltimore Orioles, the club he led to four American League pennants and the 1970 World Series championship ... Having known Earl throughout my entire career in the game, I have many fond memories of the Orioles and the Brewers squaring off as American League East rivals. Earl's managerial style proved visionary, as many people in the game adopted his strategy and techniques years later. Earl was well known for being one of the game's most colorful characters with a memorable wit, but he was also amongst its most loyal. On behalf of Major League Baseball, I send my deepest condolences to his wife, Marianna, their family and all Orioles fans."

Orioles managing partner Peter Angelos added: "Earl Weaver stands alone as the greatest manager in the history of the Orioles organization and one of the greatest in the history of baseball ... This is a sad day for everyone who knew him and for all Orioles fans. Earl made his passion for the Orioles known both on and off the field. On behalf of the Orioles, I extend my condolences to his wife, Marianna, and to his family."

His remains were cremated.

See also

 List of Major League Baseball managers by wins

References

External links

1930 births
2013 deaths
National Baseball Hall of Fame inductees
Baltimore Orioles coaches
Baltimore Orioles managers
West Frankfort Cardinals players
St. Joseph Cardinals players
Omaha Cardinals players
Winston-Salem Cardinals players
Dublin Orioles players
Fox Cities Foxes players
Aberdeen Pheasants players
Elmira Pioneers players
Houston Buffaloes players
Knoxville Smokies players
Montgomery Rebels players
Denver Bears players
New Orleans Pelicans (baseball) players
Louisville Colonels (minor league) players
Major League Baseball broadcasters
Major League Baseball first base coaches
Major League Baseball managers with retired numbers
Minor league baseball managers
Rochester Red Wings managers
Baseball players from St. Louis
People who died at sea
American sportsmen
World Series-winning managers